Scolecoseps broadleyi is a species of lizard in the family Scincidae. The species is endemic to Mozambique.

Etymology
The specific name, broadleyi, is in honor of African herpetologist Donald George Broadley.

Geographic range
S. broadleyi is found in Palma District, Cabo Delgado Province, northern Mozambique.

Habitat
The preferred natural habitat of S. broadleyi is coastal savanna with sandy soil and Berlinia orientalis trees.

Reproduction
The mode of reproduction of S. broadleyi is unknown.

References

Further reading
Verburgt L, Verburgt UK, Branch WR (2018). "A new species of Scolocoseps (Reptilia: Scincidae) from coastal north-eastern Mozambique". African Journal of Herpetology 67 (1): 86–98. (Scolecoseps broadleyi, new species).

broadleyi
Reptiles of Mozambique
Reptiles described in 2018
Taxa named by William Roy Branch